Vitali Yevgenyevich Milenin (born 16 August 1966) is a former Russian professional footballer.

Club career
He made his professional debut in the Soviet Second League in 1984 for FC Metallurg Lipetsk.

References

1966 births
People from Yelets
Living people
Soviet footballers
Russian footballers
Association football midfielders
FC Metallurg Lipetsk players
FC KAMAZ Naberezhnye Chelny players
FC Spartak Tambov players
Russian Premier League players
Sportspeople from Lipetsk Oblast